Lee Si-Young (born August 6, 1950) is a South Korean writer.

Life
Lee was born in Gurye, Jeollanam-do Province, in Korea in 1950. He began publishing poetry in 1969, leading to his first volume Manweol (Full Moon in 1976). Ten years passed before his second collection. Lee served as vice-president of  Publish Company for many years. He has also worked as the manager of the Creative Writing Center at Dankook University, and in 2012 he entered the position of chairman of the Board of the Writers Association of Korea.
.

Work

A poet of delicate sensibilities, Lee began his career depicting the gloomy everyday life under the  Park Chung-hee military dictatorship in the 1970s and 1980s from the perspective of ordinary people—the subject he has explored with much love and sympathy. Such love has manifested in his desire to seek more than mere confessional release in his poetry: Lee aims to transform his art into a song for the suffering masses. His early poems are long and prose-like even, expressing his compassion towards the poor and the weak, and at the same time, embodying his fierce determination to preserve his humanity even amidst hardships.

In the 1990s Lee's poems became drastically shorter in length. Composed of no more than two or three lines, they came to resemble Zen Buddhist poems in their use of minimal language and compacted form to encapsulate profound meaning and symbolic resonance. Lee's poems from this period recall the fact the poet had made his literary debut with sijo or traditional Korean poetry characterized by highly restricted form.

Such evolution in Lee's poetic mode indicates that the urgency and the wrenching emotions of his early years have been replaced with psychological calm and contemplative leisure. Lee has acknowledged that it is perfectly fine for him if his poems are no more than small “ripples” that carry his heart out to the readers and “lap at their feet for a moment like fallen leaves” before disappearing. Lee now hopes that in this age of excess, his poetry will remain just such small ripples.  Lee's poetry is at once a gentle reproach to overly emotional poets and at the same time the humble confession of an aging poet who has weathered much hardships and has remained true to his art.

Works in Translation
 Variations: Three Korean Poets (Cornell Univ East Asia Program, 2002)
 Patterns (Green Integer, 2014)
 Dazwischen: Gedichte (Poems from collection  translated into German by Andreas Schirmer, Edition Peperkorn, 2012)

Works in Korean (Partial)
Poetry collections 
 Full Moon (1976), 
 Into the Wind (1986), 
 Lightning Rod and Heart (1989), 
 Pattern (1994), 
 In Between (1996), 
 Calm and Blue Sky (1997), 
 Silver Whistle (2003), 
 Ocean Lake (2004)

Awards
 Seorabeol Literature Award (1994)
 Jeong Ji Yong Literature Award (1996)

References 

1950 births
Korean writers
Living people